The Ocean City Open is a defunct tennis tournament that was played on the Grand Prix tennis circuit in 1977. The event was held in Ocean City, Maryland.  Vitas Gerulaitis won the singles title while Alex Metreveli and Bill Scanlon partnered to win the doubles title.

Finals

Singles

Doubles

References
 ITF archives

Defunct tennis tournaments in the United States
Grand Prix tennis circuit
Ocean City, Maryland
Carpet court tennis tournaments
Recurring sporting events established in 1977
1977 establishments in Maryland
Recurring sporting events disestablished in 1977
1977 disestablishments in Maryland